Matt Charlton is a comedy writer, broadcaster and performer.  He has written for programmes including Listen Against and The News Quiz. His most recent projects include series four of Listen Against; a Christmas special for BBC 6 Music featuring Steve Lamacq, Greg Davies and Suede; and Britain Unzipped for BBC Three. He has recently recorded a non-broadcast pilot for his own show on BBC 6 Music.

References

1983 births
Living people
British comedians
Alumni of Birkbeck, University of London
People educated at Tunbridge Wells Grammar School for Boys